Music Video Comp Reel is a public access cable TV series based in Los Angeles that features music videos, behind the scenes and interviews for popular hip hop, rock, and pop music artists.  The first edition of Music Video Comp Reel aired in Los Angeles on July 18, 2005 at 3:00pm on Adelphia (now Time Warner Cable) featuring the band U2. This showing highlighted videos of their album How To Dismantle An Atomic Bomb which included "Vertigo" and "Sometimes You Can't Make It on Your Own".

Moving Forward
Music Video Comp Reel would later move to KSCI on June 1, 2007. Show summary for publication from the network was: Music videos are spotlighted in this series. (Music Videos). Weekly episodes aired during the summer of 2007. Music Video Comp Reel was the only local music video show airing on Free TV in two of the top seven markets in the United States. Alli Bivins opened and closed the shows airing during this period. The show filled a void for music video lovers who did not have cable or internet. Word of mouth quickly spread resulting in fan mail from as far away as India. Genres played: Alternative metal, Funk, Hip Hop music, House music, Indie rock, Pop music, Rhythm and Blues, Rock music, and Soul music.

Although the shows public following was larger than ever the executive producer moved onto another project at the end of the 2007 summer season.  The last episode to air was on August 3, 2007.

Additional music videos
 Yung Berg featuring Junior "Sexy Lady"
 Three 6 Mafia featuring Chamillionaire "Doe Boy Fresh" SonyBMG
 Amerie "Take Control" SonyBMG
 Omarion "Icebox" SonyBMG
 Seventh Day Slumber "Awake" Tooth & Nail Records
 Eric Prydz VS Floyd "Proper Education" Ministry Of Sound
 Between The Trees "The Way She Feels” 
 Consequence "Don’t Forget 'Em" Columbia Records
 Kidz in the Hall "Wheelz Fall Off ('06 'Til...)" Rawkus Records
 El-P featuring Trent Reznor "Flyentology" Definitive Jux
 John Legend "P.D.A. (We Just Don't Care)" Columbia Records
 Marques Houston "Circle" Universal Motown
 Romeo "Special Girl" Symbolic Entertainment
 Mindless Self Indulgence "Straight to Video" Metropolis Records
 The Graduate "Sit & Sink"
 El-P "Smithereens" Definitive Jux
 Frankie J "Daddy’s Little Girl" SonyBMG
 No More Kings "Sweep the Leg" Astonish Records

See also
 List of television shows set in Los Angeles

References

External links
 
 http://www.prleap.com/pr/30325/

Local music television shows in the United States
2005 American television series debuts
2007 American television series endings
American public access television shows